Hemidactylus nzingae, also known as the Queen Nzinga's tropical gecko, is a species of house gecko endemic to Angola. It is named after Queen Nzinga of Ndongo and Matamba.

References

Hemidactylus
Geckos of Africa
Reptiles of Angola
Endemic fauna of Angola
Reptiles described in 2020
Taxa named by Ishan Agarwal
Taxa named by Aaron M. Bauer
Taxa named by Luis M. P. Ceríaco
Taxa named by Mariana P. Marques